Reinhart Sasse (born 23 September 1943) is a German former field hockey player. He competed in the men's tournament at the 1968 Summer Olympics.

References

External links
 

1943 births
Living people
German male field hockey players
Olympic field hockey players of East Germany
Field hockey players at the 1968 Summer Olympics
People from Erzgebirgskreis
Sportspeople from Saxony
20th-century German people